The following lists events that happened during 1831 in Chile.

Incumbents
President of Chile: José Tomás Ovalle y Bezanilla (-8 March), Fernando Errázuriz Aldunate(8 March-18 September), José Joaquín Prieto Vial (18 September-)

Events

March
31 March - Chilean presidential election, 1831

Births
25 August - José Joaquín Prieto Vial

Deaths
21 March - José Tomás Ovalle y Bezanilla (b. 1787)

References 

 
1830s in Chile
Chile
Chile